Beit HaArava (lit. House of the Arava) is an Israeli settlement and kibbutz in the West Bank. Located near the Dead Sea and Jericho at the eponymous Beit HaArava Junction, the intersection of Highway 1 and Highway 90, it falls under the jurisdiction of Megilot Regional Council.

The international community considers Israeli settlements in the West Bank illegal under international law, but the Israeli government disputes this.

History
The village was originally established in 1939 by European members of Zionist youth movements who had fled Nazi Germany to Mandatory Palestine via Youth Aliyah. David Coren, later a member of the Knesset, was also amongst the founders. It was named after the biblical village of the same name allocated to the tribe of Benjamin, located in the Arabah plain, and means "House in the Desert". According to the Jewish National Fund, the Kibbutz became famous for its experiments in land reclamation, the residents reclaiming land that had never been previously cultivated.  kibbutz-movement historian Zvi Dror published a history of the founding of Beit HaArava in 1994, entitled  ''Shutfut Bema'aseh Habria (literally, "Participating in the Act of Creation")

In 1947, Beit HaArava had a population of over 200. On 20 May 1948, after a failure to reach an agreement with Transjordan's King Abdullah, Beit HaArava and the nearby Kalya were abandoned due to their isolation during the fighting of the 1948 Arab–Israeli War. The residents of the villages evacuated to the Israeli post at Sodom. Its members were later temporarily housed in kibbutz Shefayim, and ultimately split into two groups which in 1949 founded the kibbutzim of Gesher HaZiv and Kabri in the Western Galilee.

According to ARIJ, in 1980 Israel expropriated 506 dunams of land from the Palestinian site of Nabi Musa in order to expand construction at Beit HaArava.

In 1980, Beit HaArava was re-established as a Nahal outpost. It became a civilian community in 1986. In 2000, the site of village moved 5 kilometres westwards. Today Beit HaArava has 70 families, 30 of them members of the kibbutz, numbering approximately 400 people, with an increase of 36,5% in 2019 being the fastest growing municipality in the whole of Israel.

Economy
The world's largest operating solar pond for electricity generation was the Beit HaArava pond, which was operated until 1988. The pond had an area of 210,000 m² or 40,000 m² R.A. Haj Khalil, B.A. Jubran and N.M. Faqir has found when using a pond of surface area of 1.5 km² to generate 5 MWe.

References

Community settlements
Israeli settlements in the West Bank
Kibbutzim
Kibbutz Movement
Populated places established in 1939
Populated places established in 1980
Nahal settlements
Jewish villages in Mandatory Palestine
Jewish villages depopulated during the 1948 Arab–Israeli War
Non-religious Israeli settlements
1939 establishments in Mandatory Palestine
1980 establishments in the Israeli Military Governorate
German-Jewish culture in Israel